Katherine Hopson (born 6 January 1982) is a British sailor. She competed in the women's 470 event at the 2004 Summer Olympics.

References

External links
 

1982 births
Living people
British female sailors (sport)
Olympic sailors of Great Britain
Sailors at the 2004 Summer Olympics – 470
People from Croydon